Ishtiaq Muhammad (born 31 December 1992) is an Hong Kong cricketer. He made his One Day International debut for Hong Kong on 26 January 2016 against Scotland in the 2015–17 ICC World Cricket League Championship.

References

External links
 

1992 births
Living people
Hong Kong cricketers
Hong Kong One Day International cricketers
Place of birth missing (living people)